Mansky District is an administrative and municipal district (raion), one of the forty-three in Krasnoyarsk Krai, Russia. It is located in the south of the krai and borders with Beryozovsky District in the north and northwest, Uyarsky District in the northeast, Partizansky District in the southeast, Kuraginsky District in the south, and with Balakhtinsky District in the southwest. Its administrative center is the rural locality (a selo) of Shalinskoye. Population:  18,618 (2002 Census);  The population of Shalinskoye accounts for 24.5% of the district's total population.

Geography
Mansky District is situated in the Mana River valley.

Bolshaya Oreshnaya Cave, the second longest-stretching cave in Russia, is located on the district's territory. Other notable caves include Tyomnaya, Ledyanaya, Belaya, and Medvezhya, which are a part of the Badzheyskiye Caves nature sanctuary of regional importance—a protected area of inanimate nature and a habitat of rare species.

History
The district was founded on April 4, 1924.

Divisions and government
As of 2013, the Head of the district and the Chairman of the District Council is Sergey V. Belonozhkin.

References

Notes

Sources

Districts of Krasnoyarsk Krai
States and territories established in 1924